Peter Hirzel (born 15 July 1939) is a former Swiss cyclist. He competed in the tandem event at the 1960 Summer Olympics.

References

External links
 

1939 births
Living people
Swiss male cyclists
Olympic cyclists of Switzerland
Cyclists at the 1960 Summer Olympics
Cyclists from Zürich